Black Country Communion (also known as Black Country) is the self-titled debut studio album by English-American hard rock band Black Country Communion. Recorded in early 2010 primarily at Shangri-La Studios in Malibu, California, it was produced by Kevin Shirley and released by Mascot Records in Europe on 20 September 2010, and by J&R Adventures in North America the following day. The album reached number 13 on the UK Albums Chart and number 54 on the US Billboard 200.

Glenn Hughes and Joe Bonamassa formed Black Country Communion in November 2009, with Shirley suggesting the addition of drummer Jason Bonham and keyboardist Derek Sherinian. Much of the material for the band's debut album was written by Hughes and Bonamassa (with Shirley, Sherinian and Bonham also contributing to a number of tracks), with the pair sharing vocal duties on several songs. The basic tracks for the album were reportedly completed within just four days of recording.

Black Country Communion received positive reviews from the majority of critics, who praised its effective revival of the 1970s classic rock sound of bands such as Deep Purple and Led Zeppelin, as well as the performances of the supergroup's individual members. The album topped the UK Rock & Metal Albums Chart, as well as reaching the top 20 of the Billboard Top Rock Albums and Hard Rock Albums charts. One music video was released from the record, for the track "The Great Divide".

Writing and recording
After forming Black Country Communion in November 2009, bassist Glenn Hughes and guitarist Joe Bonamassa wrote the majority of the band's debut album together in a matter of days. Producer Kevin Shirley, drummer Jason Bonham and keyboardist Derek Sherinian also contributed to the writing of several tracks. Speaking about the writing process in an interview with EspyRock, Hughes explained that he wrote four songs in December 2009 and presented them to the rest of the band in the new year, adding that he later "locked Joe away in my house for three afternoons on three different Thursdays for three hours at a time ... and we just sat down and wrote all the songs you’re hearing in my studio". Added to the original tracks was a cover version of "Medusa", originally recorded by Hughes' band Trapeze in 1970 on their album of the same name.

Recording was also completed quickly, both due to each individual band members' ongoing schedules and commitments, as well as the preference of the group – Hughes has noted that he likes to work "under the gun", while Bonamassa has suggested that he and Shirley do not believe in "spending too much time meandering in the studio". In the liner notes for the album, Bonham claims that "It took only 4 days to lay down the basic tracks and 10 days to record and mix the entire album". Similarly, Hughes claims that "The album was recorded, totally, in five or six days with vocals and instruments". Most of the recording took place at Shangri-La Studios in Malibu, California, with additional overdubs tracked at Shirley's Malibu studio The Cave and Germano Studios in New York City.

Promotion and release
Black Country Communion was officially announced on 10 June 2010. The first song to be released from the album was "One Last Soul", which was premiered on British radio station Planet Rock on 2 August. The track was later made available as a free digital download on the band's official website. The album was released in the UK and Europe by Mascot Records on 20 September 2010, and in North America by Bonamassa's label J&R Adventures the following day. On the night of its European release, the band played its first official show at the John Henry Rehearsal Studios in London in front of a limited crowd of "around 75–100 people". The performance was broadcast on Planet Rock that night, and again later on 24 September. In promotion of the album, Black Country Communion played two shows in the UK at the end of the year – the first at the Wolverhampton Civic Hall on 29 December and the second at the Shepherd's Bush Empire in London on 30 December.

Reception

Commercial
Black Country Communion debuted at number 54 on the US Billboard 200, selling 7,100 copies in its first week. It also registered at number 6 on the Independent Albums chart (the highest the band has achieved to date), number 18 on the Top Rock Albums chart, and number 19 on the Hard Rock Albums chart. In the UK, the album debuted at number 13 on the UK Albums Chart, number 15 on the Scottish Albums Chart, number 1 on the UK Rock & Metal Albums Chart, and number 2 on the UK Independent Albums Chart. It also reached the top 20 in Germany and Sweden, number 32 in the Netherlands, number 50 in Austria, number 54 in Switzerland, number 61 in Italy, number 62 in France, and number 81 in Ireland.

Critical

Media response to Black Country Communion was generally positive. Reviewing the release for AllMusic, Eduardo Rivadavia claimed that the band "delivers the goods for much of this album", suggesting that "Black Country Communion's debut takes the dread out of the supergroup equation". Similarly, Greg Moffitt for the BBC suggested that the band had "defied the odds to deliver a collection that's all gold and no albatross", highlighting tracks such as "Black Country" and "One Last Soul". Mojo magazine's Paul Elliott differentiated Black Country Communion from Them Crooked Vultures by praising the band's "great songs", particularly "One Last Soul" and "Song of Yesterday", concluding that "Black Country Communion is one supergroup that really lives up to its billing". Paul Cole of the Sunday Mercury hailed Black Country Communion as "a great rock and roll album and the assured debut you only get from players at the very top of their game".

Following the release of the album, Black Country Communion was recognised in several categories of the Planet Rock End of Year Poll 2010 – the album came third in the Album of the Year poll, while the band won Band of the Year and Best New Band. In announcing the results, Planet Rock praised the band by highlighting "An excellent album, several musicians at the top of their game and a bunch of songs that put the classic in classic rock". Black Country Communion was also included in the Albums of the Year 2010 feature published at the end of the year by Metal Hammer magazine, ranking at number 16 on the list.

Track listing

Personnel

Chart positions

References

External links

2010 debut albums
Black Country Communion albums
Albums produced by Kevin Shirley
Mascot Records albums
Albums recorded at Shangri-La (recording studio)